Cercle Brugge Koninklijke Sportvereniging is a Belgian professional football club based in Bruges. Cercle have played in the Belgian Pro League since the 2003–04 season, having previously spent several years in the Belgian Second Division following relegation in 1997. Their matricule is the n°12. The club plays home games at the Jan Breydel Stadium, which they share with fierce rivals Club Brugge. Cercle Brugge won their first national title in 1911, and won two more titles (in 1927 and 1930) before the Second World War. The side also won the Belgian Cup in 1927 and in 1985, and have represented Belgium in European tournaments on several occasions.

History

Early years (1899–1919) 
Cercle Brugge was founded on 9 April 1899 as Cercle Sportif Brugeois by former students of the Saint Francis Xavier Institute, colloquially known as De Frères (English: The Friars)  in Bruges. Originally, the organisation focused on five sports: football, cricket, lawn tennis, running and cycling.

Cercle Brugge became a member of the Royal Belgian Football Association in 1900 and were awarded matricule number 12. The same year the club moved from their football field in Sint-Michiels, which was owned by De Frères, to a pitch in Sint-Andries, which offered better facilities and was closer to Bruges' main railway station in 't Zand square. Cercle achieved their first success in the 1902 Henri Fraeys Cup, defeating Olympique Iris Club Lillois (the predecessor of Lille OSC) and US Tourcoing. After winning another few friendly cups Cercle achieved their first big success, winning the national title in the 1910–11 season. Cercle ended a single point ahead of their main rivals FC Bruges, after their confrontation on the season's last matchday ended in a 1–1 draw.

Three years later Belgian football was devastated by World War I: Cercle lost two first-team players, Louis Baes and Joseph Evrard, and their stadium and facilities sustained heavy damage. Former player Alphonse Six also died.

Rebuilding (1919–1924) 
Cercle resumed competitive football in 1919 with an almost completely new team. Louis Saeys was the only player to remain in the team from before the war. Expectations were low, but the club finished third in the league. In 1921 the club raised a monument in remembrance of those affiliated with Cercle who had died in WWI: the unveiling was marred by tragedy, when a biplane scheduled to fly over the stadium as a tribute crashed, killing its two passengers. The monument still exists and now stands in front of the Jan Breydel Stadium.

In 1923, Cercle extended their stadium facilities again, moving 100 metres from their old pitch to a newly built stadium. This ground, later named the Edgard De Smedt Stadium, became Cercle's home for more than 50 years.

Two national titles (1924–1930) 
In 1924, the club changed its name from Cercle Sportif Brugeois to Royal Cercle Sportif Brugeois. The club embarked on a successful period, led by two key players: Belgian record international Florimond Vanhalme and player-coach Louis Saeys. Cercle led the league midway through the 1925–26 season, but player injuries led to poor results that saw them finish in fifth place. Several important players left Cercle after this season, leaving hopes low for the 1926–27 campaign, but the year saw Cercle achieve their second national championship on the penultimate matchday with a thrilling 5–6 win over Daring Bruxelles. The victory was overshadowed by two deaths at the club a few months earlier: Albert Van Coile, who had succumbed from injuries sustained in a match against US Tourcoing, and former chairman René de Peellaert, who died from pneumonia which he had caught during Van Coile's funeral.

In 1928, goalkeeper Robert Braet emerged as a new star at Cercle: the player, who had only switched from the outfield to goal after an illness, went on to spend his whole career at Cercle, later becoming chairman.

Cercle made a slow start to the 1929–30 season, entering the mid-season winter break in sixth place and seven points adrift of leaders Antwerp. Nonetheless, by the closing weekend of the season they had narrowed the gap to a single point; the final game saw them score a 4–1 victory at home to Lierse SK. The side then faced an anxious wait for the result of Antwerp against 10th placed Standard Liège, contemporary telecommunication facilities at grounds being poor. In the end, the news reached team captain Florimond Vanhalme that Antwerp had lost 3–5, meaning Cercle had won their third and (thus far) final title. Because of this title Cercle were invited to take part in the Coupe des Nations, which is regarded as the predecessor of the Champions League.

Decline (1930–1938) 
Cercle could not maintain the results of their championship season, ending 7th in 1931. New title aspirations disappeared completely as Cercle continued to finish in the middle of the league over the next several seasons. The experienced players who had helped achieve the title retired or left the team, and the youngsters who replaced them could not match their talent. The downward spiral reached a low with relegation to the Belgian Second Division in 1936. Cercle took the opportunity to make sweeping changes, appointing a new coach and board. The changes proved successful, and Cercle won promotion back to the highest division after only two years.

World War II in Belgium (1939–1945) 
The Second World War made a regular football competition impossible in 1939. Cercle therefore took part in regional championships, in which each team met another multiple times. Cercle, though, had comparatively little competition in its native West Flanders, and lost contact with the high standards maintained in the stronger Antwerp and Brussels regional championships.

A national contest resumed in 1941; Cercle finished the season last but one in the league. Usually this would have meant relegation, but the KBVB ruled that the circumstances of the war, which limited training opportunities and youth development, meant no team should be relegated.

Cercle were made to play one match behind closed doors during the 1943 season, after an incident during a game against Anderlecht. Supporters, furious with referee De Braeckel's decisions to annul two Cercle goals for unclear reasons and to award Anderlecht a goal that looked offside, chased De Braeckel from the stadium. Two Cercle fans proposed to the Cercle Brugge board that they give the referee a ride to the Bruges railway station; the board accepted, but the fans instead drove the referee toward Zedelgem, where they threw him from the car in the middle of nowhere.

Immediately after liberation in 1944, an unofficial championship was organised among the teams who had in 1939 made up the top division. Most teams, though, were unable to participate, and the Von Rundstedt Offensive spelled the end of the initiative. The end ranking of this competition has not even been archived by the Belgian football association.

Second decline and return (1945–1961) 
Cercle could not avoid relegation in the first season after the war and, despite being favorites for promotion the following season, struggled to compete in the lower league, finishing their first season there in seventh place. The next four seasons brought more mediocre league positions, until in 1951 the KBVB revealed plans to create a new second division. Clubs in the current second tier were required to finish eighth to remain in the second level; Cercle ended in 15th place that season, leaving them even further away from the top flight.

Cercle remained in this third tier until 1956, when they won their league. They spent the next season once again battling relegation, this time with more success, though their second season back in the second tier went less well. The club secured only nine points in the season's first half, avoiding relegation only with a win under coach Louis Versyp in the season's last match. A few weeks later Versyp was replaced by the Frenchman Edmond Delfour. This replacement inaugurated a more successful new era at Cercle who, under Delfour's command, missed promotion only barely in 1960 and returned at last to the top flight in 1961.

Short resurrection (1961–1965) 
Cercle had taken 15 years to return to the highest division, and remained there for only five more. They scarcely escaped relegation in their first season back at the top level, thanks only to a successful proposition by Antwerp that changed the way teams with equal points were ordered in the league. Until this season, where two teams had the same number of points the one with fewer defeats was ranked higher; under Antwerp's scheme, the team with the greater number of victories placed higher. Thanks to the changed rule Cercle finished ahead of Thor Waterschei, who would have placed above them under the previous rule. Ironically, Antwerp became victims of their own proposal: Standard obtained the second place, with Antwerp having equal points but fewer victories (but also fewer defeats).

Barren years and the five-year-plan (1965–1971) 
This spell in the top division saw Cercle enjoy little success, and in 1965–66 they finished last behind Berchem. Worse, the team was accused of corruption by Lierse player Bogaerts, who said Cercle's vice-president Paul Lantsoght had engaged in bribery. The Belgian football association sentenced Cercle to relegation from the second division to the third. Lantsoght launched a lawsuit against the KBVB, which he won in June 1967, but the damage was done: Cercle remained in the third division, losing many of their players, and were not able to achieve promotion immediately.

In 1967, Cercle appointed Urbain Braems as head coach. Braems designed an ambitious plan to restore Cercle to the top division within five years. During Braem's first season the club competed with Eendracht Aalst for promotion: they played one another two matches before the end of the season, tied on 41 points, but Aalst with the greater number of victories to their name. Cercle had to win the match to take the lead, and lost it 0–1: but Cercle's youth team coach, André Penninck, had noticed that the Aalst team delegate had made a mistake, switching the names of the substitutes, which meant that, according to the match paper, Aalst had ended the match playing illegally with two goalkeepers. Cercle lodged a complaint with the Belgian football association, who confirmed Aalst's 0–1 win, and also dismissed a first appeal. Cercle then made their second and final possible appeal, and on this instance ordered the football association to apply the rules. On 21 June 1968, Cercle received the news that the decision had been overturned, and they would be promoted to the second division. In July of the same year, Royal Cercle Sportif Brugeois changed their name to Cercle Brugge K.S.V.

Cercle were immediately able to play a role in the second division title contest, thanks to a successful transfer policy. After 20 matches Cercle led the league, only to finish the season fourth, four points behind champions AS Oostende. Next season, Cercle again finished four points behind the champions, KFC Diest. But in 1971, one year before the end of the five-year-plan, Cercle achieved their goal: they won promotion and were back at the top.

Settling at the top flight (1971–1996) 

Cercle tried immediately to avoid the relegation battle by fortifying their squad, signing Fernand Goyvaerts and Benny Nielsen. Early results saw them win points from both Anderlecht and Club Brugge, respectively champions and vice-champions that season, and they finished the season in fifth place, the first of a succession of secure midtable finishes. In 1975 the club left the Edgard De Smedt Stadium goodbye to move to the Olympia Stadium, which was later renamed the Jan Breydel Stadium during Euro 2000.

Between 1967 and 1977, Cercle had had only two coaches, Urbain Braems and Han Grijzenhout, but Grijzenhout left after a lucrative offer from SC Lokeren. Cercle appointed Lakis Petropoulos as new coach, but the appointment proved an uneasy one: language difficulties between the Greek coach and his players were compounded by player injuries, and the club was unexpectedly relegated. Han Grijzenhout was again appointed as coach to get Cercle back to the first division as soon as possible. After only one season, Cercle became champions, ending one point before SK Tongeren.

Again, Cercle enjoyed a comfortable period in the top division, climaxing with a Belgian Cup win in 1985. The final saw Cercle face SK Beveren; the score was 1–1 after 90 minutes, and 30 minutes' added time produced no further goals, so the match went to penalties. Beveren player Paul Lambrichts kicked the last penalty of the series against the crossbar, and Cercle celebrated. For the first time since 1930, Cercle qualified for an official European tournament. They drew Dynamo Dresden as opponents, winning the home match 3–2, but in Dresden Cercle lost 2–1, losing the confrontation on the away goals rule.

Cercle again reached the Belgian cup final in 1986, this time meeting city rivals Club Brugge. Cercle lost 0–3, with two questionable penalties scored by Jean-Pierre Papin. A next high point came in the recruitment of Yugoslav striker Josip Weber in 1988: despite a difficult start in Belgium, Weber proved to be Cercle's best post-war goal scorer, ranking as the team's top scorer from 1989 to 1994 (when he left for Anderlecht) successively. Weber was also national top scorer from 1992 until 1994. Another prominent player, Romanian record international Dorinel Munteanu, signed for Cercle in the 1990s.

In 1996, Cercle once more reached the national cup final, again facing Club Brugge: this time, Cercle lost 2–1. Nonetheless, Club's double victory meant Cercle still qualified for the UEFA Cup, in which they drew the Norwegian side SK Brann. Cercle won the home match 3–2, but lost 4–0 in Bergen. Cercle then lost some important players whom they failed to adequately replace, and were relegated, along with K.V. Mechelen, in 1997.

Second division (1997–2003) 
Cercle aimed at an immediate return, but were thwarted early on. They finished their first season in 10th place, and gained only a single place increase in league position over each of the next four seasons. In 2002–03 the board chose a new chairman, former Standaard Boekhandel director Frans Schotte, and a new coach, former player Jerko Tipurić, who had also been coach in Cercle's 1996–97 relegation season. The new staff helped Cercle to achieve promotion once more in 2003.

Settling in the top flight again (2003–2015) 
The 2003–4 season saw newly signed players Harold Meyssen and Nordin Jbari proving instrumental in avoiding relegation, and the Cercle board chose not to extend Tipurić's contract. Harm Van Veldhoven was chosen to replace him, and oversaw three decent but unspectacular seasons for Cercle, brightened by the emergence of the talented Stijn De Smet and Tom De Sutter. When Van Veldhoven was announced as new coach of G. Beerschot, Cercle chose former Anderlecht player and assistant manager Glen De Boeck as his successor. In his debut year, De Boeck surprised with successful attacking and attractive football. Cercle ended the season fourth in the top division, their best post-war ranking. The 2009–10 season saw them ending as runners-up in the Belgian Cup final, which was enough to qualify for the Europa League. Shortly afterwards, manager Glen De Boeck surprisingly signed a contract with Germinal Beerschot, only one month after having signed a new 4-year-deal with Cercle Brugge. De Boeck declared to the press that he only had some questions about his lawn mower for Beerschot president Herman Kesters, but had finally ended up signing for the Antwerp side. Cercle Brugge appointed AA Gent reserves coach Bob Peeters as their new manager. It will be Peeters' first experience in the Pro League. This season also brought Cercle's first European attendance in the 2010–11 UEFA Europa League, where they defeated TPS from Finland and reached the third qualifying round were they stranded against Anorthosis Famagusta F.C.. In November 2012 Peeters was fired for poor results. Despite attracting star player Eiður Guðjohnsen, he failed to get Cercle away from that last place and was replaced by Foeke Booy. The team still struggled to avoid relegation. After the bad results they sacked Foeke Booy and the new trainer was Lorenzo Staelens. Lorenzo Staelens would be replaced by Arnar Vidarsson in their last season in first division. A few months later Vidarsson would also be replaced by Dennis Van Wijk, Cercle eventually lost Play-Off III to SK Lierse and relegate to second division.

Second division, financial difficulties and take-over by Russian Oligarch (2015–present) 
The first season in the second division, Cercle ended 5th out of 17. The next season (2016–17), the competition was renamed to 1B and contained 8 teams. Manager Vincent Euvrard was sacked after a disappointing start and was replaced by José Riga. Cercle ended 7th in the competition and had to play a relegation poule with Tubize, Oud-Heverlee Leuven and Lommel United to secure their place in 1B. Lommel United ended last in the play-downs. During the season it was obvious that Cercle could not compete with other teams any more due to their financial status and the fact that many of the other teams had foreign investors. Cercle also began to search for an investor. On 15 February 2017 Cercle found in Dimitri Rybolovlev a partner to continue their existence in the future. Dimitri Rybolovlev is now the majority shareholder and owner of Cercle. On 10 March 2018, Cercle became champion in the Proximus League, the Belgian second division after winning against Beerschot 3–2 on aggregate. The winning goal – a penalty kick – was scored by Irvin Cardona, a loaned player from Monaco, in the last minute of the game and thus the season.

Honours

Domestic
Belgian First Division A:
Winners (3): 1910–11, 1926–27, 1929–30
Belgian Second Division:
Winners (5): 1937–38, 1970–71, 1978–79, 2002–03, 2017–18
Runners-up (1): 1960–61
Belgian Cup:
Winners (2): 1926–27, 1984–85
Runners-up (5): 1912–13, 1985–86, 1995–96, 2009–10, 2012–13
Belgian Supercup:
Runners-up (2): 1985, 1996

International
Tournoi Pascal
Winners (1): 1914
Runners-up (1): 1924

European cup history

Current squad

Other players under contract

Out on loan

Player history 

Note: Please consider that the flags of each club's player not only indicate one's citizenship (jus soli principle), but a nationality as well (jus sanguinis principle).

Most appearances for Cercle Brugge 
As of matches played 11 June 2011 and according to www.cerclemuseum.be

Most goals for Cercle Brugge 
As of matches played 11 June 2011 and according to www.cerclemuseum.be

Top league goalscorers per season 
According to www.cerclemuseum.be. Names in italic means that only partial match history for the season could be retrieved.

Pop Poll d'Echte 
This prize is awarded by the club's supporters, in an election held by d'Echte, a Cercle Brugge supporters' association. The election is held in two rounds. At the last home game before the winter break, and at the last home game of the season, supporters can receive a paper and vote for three players. The player with most votes after the second round wins the Pop Poll. The main criteria taken into account are performances on the pitch and the players' love for the team.

1 Alex Querter never received the award, because of his move to city rivals Club Brugge the same season. The organisers of the award concluded that Querter's decision failed to satisfy the criterion of "love for the team".

Coaching staff

Former head coaches 

 Joseph Dewulf (1910–14)
 Louis Saeys (1914–28)
 Florimond Vanhalme (1928–37)
 William Maxwell (1937–38)
 Hugo Fenichel (1938–40)
 Florimond Vanhalme (1940–41)
 Louis Saeys (1941–42)
 Willy Steyskal (1942–44)
 Louis Baes (1944–46)
 André De Schepper (1946–48)
 Louis Baes (1948–50)
 Georges Vanden Bempt (1950–51)
 Bill Kennedy (1951–52)
 Louis Versyp (1952–54)
 Arthur Ruysschaert (a.i.)1 (1953–54)
 Guy Thys (1954–56)
 Louis Versyp (1956–57)
 Edmond Delfour (1958–62)
 Jules Bigot (1962–63)
 Georges Meuris (1963–66)
 Jules Van Dooren (1966–67)
 Urbain Braems (1967–72)
 Han Grijzenhout (1972–77)
 Lakis Petropoulos (1977–78)
 Lucien Masyn (1978)
 Han Grijzenhout (1978–79)
 Leo Canjels (1979–82)
 Han Grijzenhout (1982–83)
 Henk Houwaart (1983–84)
 Bram van Kerkhof (1984)
 Georges Leekens (1984 – 30 June 1987)
 René Taelman (1987–88)
 Roland Rotty (1988–89)
 Han Grijzenhout (1989–91)
 Eric Lagrou (1991)
 Henk Houwaart (1 July 1991 – 30 June 1993)
 Georges Leekens (1 Nov 1993 – 30 June 1994)
 Jerko Tipurić (1994–97)
 Rudy Verkempinck (1997–98)
 Ronny Desmedt (1998–99)
 Dennis Van Wijk (31 Oct 1998 – 30 June 2002)
 Jerko Tipurić (2002–04)
  Harm Van Veldhoven (22 May 2004 – 30 June 2007)
 Glen De Boeck (1 July 2007 – 2010)
 Bob Peeters (27 May 2010 – 27 Oct 2012)
 Lorenzo Staelens (a.i.) (28 Oct 2012–??)
 Foeke Booy (5 Nov 2012 – 4 April 2013)
 Lorenzo Staelens (2013–2014)
 Arnar Viðarsson (2014–2015)
 Dennis Van Wijk (2015)
 Frederik Vanderbiest (2015–2016)
 Vincent Euvrard (2016)
  José Riga (2016–2017)
  Franky Vercauteren (2017-2018)
   Laurent Guyot (2018–2019)
   Fabien Mercadal (1 July 2019 – 7 Oct 2019)
  Bernd Storck (12 Oct 2019 – 31 May 2020)
  Paul Clement (3 July 2020 – 1 Feb 2021)

Notes:
 Ruysschaert replaced the suspended Versyp for a few months.

Chairmen history

See also 

 Bruges derby

References

Further reading 
Roland Podevijn, Cercle Brugge 1899–1989, K.S.V. Cercle Brugge, 1989

External links 

 Official website 
 Cercle Brugge at UEFA.COM

 
Football clubs in Bruges
1899 establishments in Belgium
Association football clubs established in 1899
Organisations based in Belgium with royal patronage
Belgian Pro League clubs